Agency Village is an unincorporated area and census-designated place (CDP) in Roberts County, South Dakota, United States. It is the headquarters of the Sisseton Wahpeton Oyate and home to Sisseton Wahpeton College. Since 2020, the CDP includes the community known as Goodwill. The population of the CDP was 776 at the 2020 census.

The village hosts a number of powwows, one of which is held annually just before Independence Day. This outdoor powwow draws a large number of tourists to the area. The community is primarily made up of members of the tribe.

Geography
Agency Village is in Goodwill and Agency townships and is part of the Lake Traverse Reservation. The community has a post office assigned ZIP code 57262, which it shares with nearby Sisseton.

Demographics

2020 census

Note: the US Census treats Hispanic/Latino as an ethnic category. This table excludes Latinos from the racial categories and assigns them to a separate category. Hispanics/Latinos can be of any race.

2000 population
Agency Village was not counted separately during the 2000 Census. The township reported 277 people, 83 households, and 70 families.

Education
Schools in the community:
 Tiospa Zina Tribal School (affiliated with the Bureau of Indian Education)

The community lies in the boundary of Sisseton School District 54-2.

References

Census-designated places in Roberts County, South Dakota
Census-designated places in South Dakota
Seats of government of American Indian reservations
Sisseton Wahpeton Oyate